Prof. Ing. Lubomír Dvořák, CSc. (born 10 July 1940, in Rokytnice) is a Czech scientist specialising in experimental physics.

From  1997 to 2000 and again between 2006 and 2010 he was Rector of the Palacký University of Olomouc.

Between 1993 and 1997 and again from 2003 till 2006 he served as the Dean of the Faculty of Science at Olomouc. Since 2010 he has been University Vice-Rector for Regional Development, one of seven vice-rectors currently at Olomouc.

External links
 Životopis na stránkách olomoucké univerzity
 Odborný životopis na stránkách katedry experimentální fyziky PřF UP

1940 births
Czech physicists
Living people
Academic staff of Palacký University Olomouc
Rectors of the Palacký University Olomouc
Experimental physicists